Orok Akarandut  (born March 18, 1987 in Uyo, Akwa Ibom State) is a Nigerian football player currently playing for Akwa United.

Career
Akarandut began his career with Akwa United F.C. who in January 2007 was promoted to the Nigerian Premier League. In the 2008-09 season, he was the league's top goalscorer with 17 goals, which tied the scoring record. 
After this big performance, Orok left Akwa United to sign with Tunisian Ligue Professionnelle 1 club CS Sfax on 13 July 2009.
He signed for Al-Hidd FC of Bahrain in 2014, having scored 18 goals in 33 games

References

1987 births
Living people
People from Uyo
Nigerian footballers
Expatriate footballers in Tunisia
CS Sfaxien players
Nigerian expatriate sportspeople in Tunisia
Akwa United F.C. players
Emirates Club players
Expatriate footballers in the United Arab Emirates
Stade Tunisien players
Nigeria Professional Football League players
UAE Pro League players
AS Gabès players
Association football forwards
21st-century Nigerian people